Bimbi may refer to:
Bimbi, New South Wales
Bartolomeo Bimbi (1648–1729), Italian painter
Bimbi (singer) (1908–1991), Cuban singer born Maximiliano Sánchez
Bimbi (actor), Indian actor featured on the 1971 film Phir Bhi
Bimbi (cult), a form of African traditional religion in Malawi

See also
Bimby, cooking appliance